Linjiang (临江市) is a county-level city of Jilin, China.

Linjiang may refer to:

Zhong County, formerly named Linjiang (临江), county of Chongqing Municipality

Subdistricts (临江街道)
Linjiang Subdistrict, Cangshan District, Fuzhou, Fujian
Linjiang Subdistrict, Licheng District, Quanzhou, Fujian
Linjiang Subdistrict, Xisaishan District, Huangshi, Hubei
Linjiang Subdistrict, Chuanying District, Jilin City, Jilin
Linjiang Subdistrict, Ningjiang District, Songyuan, Jilin
Linjiang Subdistrict, Zhenxing District, Dandong, Liaoning

Towns (临江镇)
Linjiang, Kai County, Chongqing
Linjiang, Yongchuan District, Chongqing
Linjiang, Tongjiang City, Jiamusi, Heilongjiang
Linjiang, Lanxi County, Suihua, Heilongjiang
Linjiang, Pucheng County, Nanping, Fujian
Linjiang, Shanghang County, Longyan, Fujian
Linjiang, Zijin County, Heyuan, Guangdong
Linjiang, Haimen City, Nantong, Jiangsu
Linjiang, Zhangshu City, Yichuan, Jiangxi
Linjiang, Shizhong District, Leshan, Sichuan
Linjiang, Yanjiang District, Leshan, Sichuan
Linjiang, Lucheng District, Wenzhou, Zhejiang